Dmitry Gennadyevich Loshkaryov (born 26 March 1987) is a Russian former professional association football player.

Club career
He played 3 seasons in the Russian Football National League for FC Oryol, FC Sodovik Sterlitamak and FC Krasnodar.

External links
 
 

1987 births
People from Volokolamsky District
Living people
Russian footballers
Association football midfielders
FC Saturn Ramenskoye players
FC Oryol players
FC Sodovik Sterlitamak players
FC Krasnodar players
FC Sportakademklub Moscow players
Sportspeople from Moscow Oblast